Urban flooding is the inundation of land or property in a built environment, particularly in more densely populated areas, caused by rainfall overwhelming the capacity of drainage systems, such as storm sewers. Although sometimes triggered by events such as flash flooding or snowmelt, urban flooding is a condition, characterized by its repetitive and systemic impacts on communities, that can happen regardless of whether or not affected communities are located within designated floodplains or near any body of water. Aside from potential overflow of rivers and lakes, snowmelt, stormwater or water released from damaged water mains may accumulate on property and in public rights-of-way, seep through building walls and floors, or backup into buildings through sewer pipes, toilets and sinks.

In urban areas, flood effects can be exacerbated by existing paved streets and roads, which increase the speed of flowing water. Impervious surfaces prevent rainfall from infiltrating into the ground, thereby causing a higher surface run-off that may be in excess of local drainage capacity.

The flood flow in urbanized areas constitutes a hazard to both the population and infrastructure. Some recent catastrophes include the inundations of Nîmes (France) in 1998 and Vaison-la-Romaine (France) in 1992, the flooding of New Orleans (USA) in 2005, and the flooding in Rockhampton, Bundaberg, Brisbane during the 2010–2011 summer in Queensland (Australia). Flood flows in urban environments have been studied relatively recently despite many centuries of flood events. Some recent research has considered the criteria for safe evacuation of individuals in flooded areas.

Background 

There are several types of flooding, including pluvial (flooding caused by heavy rain), fluvial (caused by a nearby river overflowing its banks), and coastal flooding (often caused by storm surges). Different types of urban flooding create different impacts and require different mitigation strategies.

Links to climate change 
Many of the common causes of urban flooding, including storm surges, heavy precipitation, and river overflow, are expected to increase in frequency and severity as climate change intensifies and causes increases in ocean and river levels. In particular, erratic rainfall patterns are expected to increase the frequency and severity of both pluvial flooding (as excessive amounts of rainfall in urban areas and cannot be adequately absorbed by existing drainage systems and pervious areas) and fluvial flooding (as excessive rainfall over a river can cause flooding and overflow, either where it occurs or downstream along the path of the river). The frequencies and severities of extreme storm events, including hurricanes and other types of tropical cyclones, are also expected to increase, raising the risk of storm surges and the potential for heavy rainfall and increasing flooding-related damages by up to US$54B annually. Additionally, due to the geographic distribution of developing urban areas, the land area potentially exposed to climate change-related flooding is expected to increase significantly.

Case studies 
One of the most well known at-risk urban areas in the United States is New Orleans. Because of its coastal location and low elevation, the city is prone to flooding due to tropical storms, including cyclones and hurricanes and is particularly vulnerable to changes in sea level or storm frequency. In 2005, Hurricane Katrina caused more than 1800 deaths and US$170B in damages. After Katrina, additional flood protections were built with a changing climate in mind; these protections have proved effective in reducing damages due to subsequent extreme weather events, such as Hurricane Ida.

During the summer of 2021, Hurricanes Henri and Ida caused significant flooding in many cities along the east coast of the United States. In particular, New York City experienced record levels of rainfall, prompting many to question whether the city should implement additional flood protection measures in anticipation of potential future flood events. In September 2021, the New York City mayoral office released a new rainfall preparedness plan.

Impacts 
Some of the most obvious impacts of urban flooding are those to human life and to property damage. In 2020, floods caused an estimated 6,000 deaths and caused US$51.3B in damages globally. Flood and its related disasters are caused by excessive volumes of water (runoff) which are not absorbed by the ground. Residents at low-elevated regions are often at risk of inundation, financial loss, and even the loss of lives. As the pace of urbanisation accelerates around the world, flash flood damage takes place more frequently. Between 1961 and 2020, nearly 10,000 cases were reported with 1.3 million deaths and a minimum of USD 3.3 trillion of financial losses at an equivalent loss rate of almost USD 1800 per second. On average, the total reported deaths worldwide were around 23,000/year for the past 6 decades at an equivalent rate of one death every 24 min. 

Urban flooding also impacts critical public services, including public transportation systems. Traffic congestion can be worsened by urban flood events, impacting ease of access to transportation, as well as the ability of emergency services to operate effectively. Urban flooding can also create far-reaching supply chain issues, which can create significant interruptions in the availability of goods and services, as well as financial losses for businesses.

Economic impacts 
Urban flooding has significant economic implications. In the US, industry experts estimate that wet basements can lower property values by 10%-25% and are cited among the top reasons for not purchasing a home. According to the U.S Federal Emergency Management Agency (FEMA), almost 40% of small businesses never reopen their doors following a flooding disaster. In the UK, urban flooding is estimated to cost £270 million a year in England and Wales; 80,000 homes are at risk.

A study of Cook County, Illinois, identified 177,000 property damage insurance claims made across 96% of the county's ZIP codes over a five-year period from 2007-2011. This is the equivalent of one in six properties in the County making a claim. Average payouts per claim were $3,733 across all types of claims, with total claims amounting to $660 million over the five years examined.

Despite concerted efforts, many communities lack the funds to fully address these issues and often seek funds elsewhere. Numerous watersheds within Los Angeles County, California do not meet state water quality standards, despite spending $100 million a year on clean water programs to combat issues such as urban runoff. To combat this problem, officials have introduced a measure that would assess a fee to homeowners and local businesses in an attempt to raise $290 million for effective urban runoff management.

Modeling 
Flood modeling is often conducted in a very localized fashion, with hydrological models created for individual municipalities and incorporating details about buildings, infrastructure, vegetation, land use, and drainage systems. This localized modeling can be very useful, especially when paired with historical data, in predicting which specific locations (e.g. streets or intersections) will be the most impacted during a flood event and can be helpful in designing effective mitigation systems specific to local needs.

Flood flows in urban environments have been investigated relatively recently despite many centuries of flood events. Some researchers mentioned the storage effect in urban areas. Several studies looked into the flow patterns and redistribution in streets during storm events and the implication in terms of flood modelling. Some recent research considered the criteria for safe evacuation of individuals in flooded areas. But some recent field measurements during the 2010–2011 Queensland floods showed that any criterion solely based upon the flow velocity, water depth or specific momentum cannot account for the hazards caused by the velocity and water depth fluctuations. These considerations ignore further the risks associated with large debris entrained by the flow motion.

Modeling of climate impacts, on the other hand, is often done from a "top-down", global perspective. While these models can be helpful in predicting worldwide effects of global warming and in raising awareness about large-scale impacts, their spatial resolution is often limited to 25 km or more, making them less helpful for local planners in mitigating the effects of climate change on a street-by-street scale.

Some advocate for an integration of localized hydrological modeling with larger-scale climate modeling, claiming that such integration allows the benefits of both forms of modeling to be realized simultaneously and creates the potential for modeling flooding due to climate change in a way that allows planners to design specific strategies to mitigate it at the local level.

The curve number (CN) rainfall–runoff model is widely adopted. However, it had been reported to repeatedly fail in consistently predicting runoff results worldwide. Unlike the existing antecedent moisture condition concept, one of the recent studies preserved the parsimonious curve number runoff predictive basic framework for model calibration according to different watershed’s saturation conditions under guidance from inferential statistics. The study also showed that the existing CN runoff predictive model was not statistically significant without recalibration. CN runoff predictive model can be calibrated according to regional rainfall-runoff dataset for urban flash flood prediction.

Management

Mitigation

Gray infrastructure 
One traditional urban flooding management strategy is gray infrastructure, which is a set of infrastructure types (including dams and seawalls) traditionally constructed of concrete or other impervious materials and designed to prevent the flow of water. While gray infrastructure can be effective in preventing flooding-related damage and can be economically valuable, some models suggest that gray infrastructure may become less effective at preventing flood-related impacts in urban areas in the future as climate change causes flooding intensity and frequency to increase.

Green infrastructure 

An alternative to gray infrastructure is green infrastructure, which refers to a set of strategies for absorbing and storing stormwater at or close to the location where it falls. Green infrastructure includes many types of vegetation, large open areas with pervious surfaces, and even rainwater collection devices. Green infrastructure may prove to be an effective and cost-efficient way to reduce the extent of urban flooding.

Drainage systems 
One way urban flooding is commonly mitigated is via urban drainage systems, which transport storm water away from streets and businesses and into appropriate storage and drainage areas. While urban drainage systems help municipalities manage flooding and can be scaled up as population and urban extent increase, these systems may not be sufficient to mitigate additional future flooding due to climate change.

Land use 
Since the ratio of pervious to impervious surfaces across an area is important in flooding management, understanding and altering land use and the proportion of land allocated to different purposes/use types is important in flood management planning. In particular, increasing the percent of land dedicated to open, vegetated space can be helpful in providing an absorption and storage area for storm runoff. These areas can often be integrated with existing urban amenities, such as parks and golf courses. Increasing the pervious surface fraction of an urban area (e.g. by planting green walls/roofs or using alternative pervious construction materials) can also help de-risk climate-linked flood events.

See also 
Green infrastructure
Integrated urban water management
Climate modeling

References 

Flood control
Stormwater management
Drainage